Palestinian Christians are Christian citizens of the State of Palestine. In the wider definition of Palestinian Christians, including the Palestinian refugees, diaspora and people with full or partial Palestinian Christian ancestry this can be applied to an estimated 500,000 people worldwide as of 2000. Palestinian Christians belong to one of a number of Christian denominations, including Eastern Orthodoxy, Oriental Orthodoxy, Catholicism (Eastern and Western rites), Anglicanism, Lutheranism, other branches of Protestantism and others. Bernard Sabella of Bethlehem University estimates that 6% of the Palestinian population worldwide is Christian and that 56% of them live outside of the region of Palestine. In both the local dialect of Palestinian Arabic and in Classical Arabic or Modern Standard Arabic, Christians are called Nasrani (the Arabic word Nazarene) or Masihi (a derivative of Arabic word Masih, meaning "Messiah"). Hebrew-speakers call them Notzri (also spelt Notsri), which means Nazarene (originated from Nazareth).

, Palestinian Christians comprise approximately 1–2.5% of the population of the West Bank, and less than 1% in the Gaza Strip. According to official British Mandatory estimates, Palestine's Christian population in 1922 constituted 9.5% of the total Mandatory Palestine population (10.8% of the Palestinian Arab population), and 7.9% in 1946. 
A large number of Arab Christians fled or were expelled from the Jewish-controlled areas of Mandatory Palestine during the 1948 Arab–Israeli War, and a small number left during the period (1948–1967) of Jordanian control of the West Bank for economic reasons. From 1967, during the Israeli military rule, the Palestinian Christian population has increased while as a percentage of the population continued to decrease.

There are also many Palestinian Christians who are descendants of Palestinian refugees from the post-1948 era who fled to Christian-majority countries and formed large diaspora Christian communities. Worldwide, there are nearly one million Palestinian Christians in these territories as well as in the Palestinian diaspora, comprising around 6–7% of the world's total Palestinian population. Palestinian Christians live primarily in Arab states surrounding historic Palestine and in the diaspora, particularly in Europe and the Americas.

Demographics and denominations

1922

In the 1922 census of Palestine there were approximately 73,000 Christian Palestinians: 46% Orthodox, 40% Catholic (20% Roman Catholic, and 20% Eastern Catholic.

The census recorded over 200 localities with a Christian population. The totals by denomination for all of Mandatory Palestine were: Greek Orthodox 33,369, Syriac Orthodox (Jacobite) 813, Latin Catholic 14,245, Greek Catholic (Melkite) 11,191, Syriac Catholic 323, Armenian Catholic 271, Maronite 2,382, Armenian Orthodox (Gregorian) 2,939, Coptic Church 297, Abyssinian Church 85, Church of England 4,553, Presbyterian Church 361, Protestants 826, Lutheran Church 437, Templars Community 724, others 208.

Modern day
In 2009, there were an estimated 50,000 Christians in the Palestinian territories, mostly in the West Bank, with about 3,000 in the Gaza Strip. In 2022, about 1,100 Christians lived in the Gaza Strip - down from over 1300 in 2014. About 80% of the Christian Palestinians live in an urban environment. In the West Bank, they are concentrated mostly in Jerusalem and its vicinity: Bethlehem, Beit Jala, Beit Sahour, Ramallah, Bir Zayt, Jifna, Ein Arik, Taybeh.

Of the total Christian population of 154,000 in Israel, about 80% are designated as Arabs, many of whom self-identify as Palestinian. 

The majority (56%) of Palestinian Christians live in the Palestinian diaspora.

Around 50% of Palestinian Christians belong to the Greek Orthodox Church of Jerusalem, one of the 15 churches of Eastern Orthodoxy. This community has also been known as the Arab Orthodox Christians. There are also Maronites, Melkites, Jacobites, Chaldeans, Latin Catholics, Syriac Catholics, Orthodox Copts, Coptic Catholics, Armenian Orthodox, Armenian Catholics, Quakers (Society of Friends), Methodists, Presbyterians, Anglicans (Episcopal), Lutherans, Evangelicals, Pentecostals, Nazarene, Assemblies of God, Baptists and other Protestants; in addition to small groups of Jehovah's Witnesses, members of the Church of Jesus Christ of Latter-day Saints and others.

Patriarch Theophilos III is the leader of the Greek Orthodox Church of Jerusalem since 2005. He replaced Irenaios (in office from 2001), who was deposed by the church synod after a term surrounded by controversy and scandal given that he sold Palestinian property to Israeli Orthodox Jews. The Israel government initially refused to recognize Theophilos's appointment but finally granted full recognition in December 2007, despite a legal challenge by his predecessor Irenaios. Archbishop Theodosios (Hanna) of Sebastia  the highest ranking Palestinian clergyman in the Greek Orthodox Patriarchate of Jerusalem.

The Latin Patriarch of Jerusalem is the leader of the Latin Catholics in Jerusalem, Palestine, Jordan, Israel and Cyprus. The office has been held by Pierbattista Pizzaballa since his appointment by Pope Francis on 6 November 2020. George Bacouni, of the Melkite Greek Catholic Church, is Archbishop of Akka, with jurisdiction over Haifa, Acre and the Galilee, and replaced Elias Chacour, a Palestinian refugee, in 2014. Moussa El-Hage, of the Maronite Church, is since 2012 simultaneously Archbishop of the Archeparchy of Haifa and the Holy Land and Patriarchal Exarch of Jerusalem and Palestine.

The Anglican Bishop in Jerusalem is Suheil Dawani, who replaced Bishop Riah Abou Al Assal. Bishop Dr. Munib Younan is the president of the Lutheran World Federation and the Bishop of the Evangelical Lutheran Church in Jordan and the Holy Land (ELCJHL).

History

Background and early history

The first Christian communities in Roman Judea originated from the followers of Jesus of Nazareth, who was put to death and crucified by order of Prefect Pontius Pilate in 30-33; they were Aramaic speaking Messianic Jews and, later, Latin and Greek-speaking Romans and Greeks, who were in part descendants from previous settlers of the regions, such as Syro-Phoenicians, Arameans, Greeks, Persians, and Arabs such as Nabataeans.

Contrary to other groups of oriental Christians such as the largely Assyrian Nestorians, the vast majority of Palestinian Christians went under the ecclesiastical jurisdiction of the Ecumenical Patriarchate and Roman emperors after the Council of Chalcedon in 451 AD (which would be part of the Eastern Orthodox Church after the Great Schism), and were known by other Syrian Christians as Melkites (followers of the king). The Melkites were heavily Hellenised in the following centuries, abandoning their distinct Western Aramaic languages in favour of Greek. By the 7th century, Jerusalem and Byzantine Palestine became the epicentre of Greek culture in the Orient.

Soon after the Muslim conquests, the Melkites began abandoning Greek for Arabic, a process which made them the most Arabicised Christians in the Levant.

Most Palestinian Christians nowadays see themselves as culturally and linguistically Arab Christians with ancestors dating back to the first followers of Christ. They claim descent from Romans, Ghassanid Arabs, Byzantines, and Crusaders. The region consisting mainly of modern Israel and the State of Palestine is considered to be the Holy Land by Christians. Major Christian holy cities such as Bethlehem, Nazareth and Jerusalem are located in Israel and the State of Palestine.

That Christian Arabs in Palestine see themselves as Arab nationalistically reflects also the fact that, as of the beginning of the twentieth century, they shared many of the same customs as their Muslim neighbors. In some respects, this was a consequence of Christians adopting what were essentially Islamic practices, many of which were derived of sharî'ah. In others, it was more the case that the customs shared by both Muslims and Christians derived from neither faith, but rather were a result of a process of syncretization, whereby what had once been pagan practices were later redefined as Christian and subsequently adopted by Muslims. This was especially evident in the fact that Palestine's Muslims and Christians shared many of the same feast days, in honor of the same saints, even if they referred to them by different names. "Shrines dedicated to St. George, for instance, were transformed into shrines honoring Khidr-Ilyas, a conflation of the Prophet Elijah and the mythical sprite Khidr". Added to this, many Muslims viewed local Christian churches as saints' shrines. Thus, for instance, a "Muslim women having difficulties conceiving, for instance, might travel to Bethlehem to pray for a child before the Virgin Mary". It was even not uncommon for a Muslim to have his child baptized in a Christian church, in the name of Khaḍr.

Modern history

The category of 'Palestinian Arab Christian' came to assume a political dimension in the 19th century as international interest grew and foreign institutions were developed there. The urban elite began to undertake the construction of a modern multi-religious Arab civil society. When the British received from the League of Nations a mandate to administer Palestine after World War I, many British dignitaries in London were surprised to discover so many Christian leaders in the Palestinian Arab political movements. The British authorities in the Mandate of Palestine had difficulty understanding the commitment of the Palestinian Christians to Palestinian nationalism.

Palestinian Christian owned Falastin was founded in 1911 in the then Arab-majority city of Jaffa. The newspaper is often described as one of the most influential newspapers in historic Palestine, and probably the nation's fiercest and most consistent critic of the Zionist movement. It helped shape Palestinian identity and nationalism and was shut down several times by the Ottoman and British authorities, most of the time due to complaints made by Zionists.

The Nakba left the multi-denominational Christian Arab communities in disarray. They had little background in theology, their work being predominantly pastoral, and their immediate task was to assist the thousands of homeless refugees. But it also sowed the seeds for the development of a Liberation Theology among Palestinian Arab Christians. There was a differential policy of expulsion. More lenience was applied to the Christians of the Galilee where expulsion mostly affected Muslims: at Tarshiha, Me'eliya, Dayr al-Qassi, and Salaban, Christians were allowed to remain while Muslims were driven out. At Iqrit and Bir'im the IDF ordered Christians to evacuate for a brief spell, an order that was then confirmed as a permanent expulsion. Sometimes in a mixed Druze-Christian village like al-Rama, only the Christians were initially expelled towards Lebanon, but, thanks to the intervention of the local Druze, they were permitted to return. Important Christian figures were sometimes allowed to return, on condition they help Israel among their communities. Archbishop Hakim, with many hundreds of Christians, was allowed reentry on expressing a willingness to campaign against Communists in Israel and among his flock.

After the war of 1948, the Christian population in the West Bank, under Jordanian control, dropped slightly, largely due to economic problems. This contrasts with the process occurring in Israel where Christians left en masse after 1948. Constituting 21% of Israel's Arab population in 1950, they now make up just 9% of that group. These trends accelerated after the 1967 war in the aftermath of Israel's takeover of the West Bank and Gaza.

In Palestinian Authority (from 1994)

Christians within the Palestinian Authority constituted around one in seventy-five residents. In 2009, Reuters reported that 47,000–50,000 Christians remained in the West Bank, with around 17,000 following the various Catholic traditions and most of the rest following the Orthodox church and other eastern denominations. Both Bethlehem and Nazareth, which were once overwhelmingly Christian, now have Muslim majorities. Today about three-quarters of all Bethlehem Christians live abroad, and more Jerusalem Christians live in Sydney, Australia than in Jerusalem. Christians now comprise 2.5 percent of the population of Jerusalem. Those remaining include a few born in the Old City when Christians there constituted a majority.

In a 2007 letter from Congressman Henry Hyde to President George W. Bush, Hyde stated that "the Christian community is being crushed in the mill of the bitter Israeli-Palestinian conflict" and that expanding Jewish settlements in the West Bank, including East Jerusalem, were "irreversibly damaging the dwindling Christian community".

In November 2009, Berlanty Azzam, a Palestinian Christian student from Gaza, was expelled from Bethlehem and was not allowed to continue her studying. She had two months left for the completion of her degree. Berlanty Azzam said the Israeli military handcuffed her, blindfolded her, and left her waiting for hours at a checkpoint on her way back from a job interview in Ramallah. She described the incident as "frightening" and claimed Israeli official treated her like a criminal and denied her an education because she is a Palestinian Christian from Gaza.

In July 2014, during operation Protective Edge an Israeli-Arab Christian demonstration was held in Haifa in a protest against Muslim extremism in the Middle East (concerning the rise of the Islamic State) and in support of Israel and the IDF.

Christian Arabs are one of the most educated groups in Israel. Statistically, Christian Arabs in Israel have the highest rates of educational attainment among all religious communities, according to a data by Israel Central Bureau of Statistics in 2010, 63% of Israeli Christian Arabs have had college or postgraduate education, the highest of any religious and ethno-religious group. Despite the fact that Arab Christians only represent 2.1% of the total Israeli population, in 2014 they accounted for 17.0% of the country's university students, and for 14.4% of its college students. There are more Christians who have attained a bachelor's degree or higher academic degrees than the median Israeli population. Also Christian Arabs have one of the highest rates of success in the matriculation examinations, (73.9%) in 2017 both in comparison to the Muslims and the Druze and in comparison to all students in the Jewish education system as a group. Arab Christians were also the vanguard in terms of eligibility for higher education, and they have attained a bachelor's degree and academic degree more than the median Israeli population. Christians schools in Israel went on strike in 2015 at the beginning of the 2015 academic year in protest at budget cuts aimed at them. The strike affected 33,000 pupils, 40 percent of them Muslim. In 2013, Israel covered 65% of the budget of Palestinian Christian schools in Israel, a figure cut that year to 34%. Christians say they now received a third of what Jewish schools receive, with a shortfall of $53 million.

The rate of students studying in the field of medicine was also higher among the Christian Arab students, compared with all the students from other sectors. The percentage of Arab Christian women who are higher education students is higher than other sectors.

In September 2014, Israel's interior minister signed an order that the self-identified ''Aramean Christian'' minority in Israel could register as Arameans rather than Arabs. The order will affect about 200 families.

The first local woman cleric ordained in the Holy Land was Palestinian Sally Azar of the Lutheran church in 2023.

Political and ecumenical issues
The mayors of Ramallah, Birzeit, Bethlehem, Zababdeh, Jifna, Ein 'Arik, Aboud, Taybeh, Beit Jala and Beit Sahour are Christians. The Governor of Tubas, Marwan Tubassi, is a Christian. The former Palestinian representative to the United States, Afif Saffieh, is a Christian, as is the ambassador of the Palestinian Authority in France, Hind Khoury. The Palestinian women's football team has a majority of Muslim girls, but the captain, Honey Thaljieh, is a Christian from Bethlehem. Many of the Palestinian officials such as ministers, advisers, ambassadors, consulates, heads of missions, PLC, PNA, PLO, Fateh leaders and others are Christians. Some Christians were part of the affluent segments of Palestinian society that left the country during the 1948 Arab–Israeli War. In West Jerusalem, over 50% of Christian Palestinians lost their homes to the Israelis, according to the historian Sami Hadawi.

Christian converts from Islam
Though numbering only a few hundred, there is a community of Christians who have converted from Islam. They are not centered in one particular city and mostly belong to various evangelical and charismatic communities. Due to the fact that official conversion from Islam to Christianity is illegal in accordance with Islamic sharia law in Palestine, these individuals tend to keep a low profile.

Ecumenical Liberation Theology Center: Sabeel
The Sabeel Ecumenical Liberation Theology Center is a Christian non-governmental organization based in Jerusalem; was founded in 1990 as an outgrowth of a conference regarding "Palestinian Liberation Theology." According to its web site, "Sabeel is an ecumenical grassroots liberation theology movement among Palestinian Christians. Inspired by the life and teaching of Jesus Christ, this liberation theology seeks to deepen the faith of Palestinian Christians, to promote unity among them toward social action. Sabeel strives to develop a spirituality based on love, justice, peace, nonviolence, liberation and reconciliation for the different national and faith communities. The word "Sabeel" is Arabic for 'the way' and also a 'channel' or 'spring' of life-giving water."

Sabeel has been criticized for its belief that "Israel is solely culpable for the origin and continuation of the Israeli–Palestinian conflict," and for using "anti-Semitic deicide imagery against Israel, and of disparaging Judaism as 'tribal,' 'primitive,' and 'exclusionary,' in contrast to Christianity’s 'universalism' and 'inclusiveness.'" In addition, Daniel Fink, writing on behalf of NGO Monitor, shows that Sabeel leader Naim Ateek has described Zionism as a "step backward in the development of Judaism", and Zionists as "oppressors and war makers".

"Kairos Palestine" document (2009)
In December 2009, a number of prominent Palestinian Christian activists, both clergy and lay people, released the Kairos Palestine document, "A moment of truth." Among the authors of the document are Michel Sabbah, former Latin Patriarch of Jerusalem, Archbishop Attalah Hanna, Father Jamal Khader, Rev. Mitri Raheb, Rev. Naim Ateek and Rifat Kassis who is the coordinator and chief spokesperson of the group.

The document declares the Israeli occupation of Palestine a "sin against God" and against humanity. It calls on churches and Christians all over the world to consider it and adopt it and to call for the boycott of Israel. Section 7 calls for "the beginning of a system of economic sanctions and boycott to be applied against Israel." It states that isolation of Israel will cause pressure on Israel to abolish all of what it labels as "apartheid laws" that discriminate against Palestinians and non-Jews.

Holy Land Christian Ecumenical Foundation
The Holy Land Christian Ecumenical Foundation (HCEF) was founded in 1999 by an ecumenical group of American Christians to preserve the Christian presence in the Holy Land. HCEF stated goal is to attempt to continue the presence and well-being of Arab Christians in the Holy Land and to develop the bonds of solidarity between them and Christians elsewhere. HCEF offers material assistance to Palestinian Christians and to churches in the area. HCEF advocates for solidarity on the part of Western Christians with Christians in the Holy Land.

Christians of Gaza

In 2022, there were approximately 1,100 Christians in the Gaza Strip, down from 1,300 in 2013. Gaza's Christian community mostly lives within the city, especially in areas neighbouring the three main churches: Church of Saint Porphyrius, The Holy Family Catholic Parish in Zeitoun Street, and the Gaza Baptist Church, in addition to an Anglican chapel in the Al-Ahli Al-Arabi Arab Evangelical Hospital. Saint Porphyrius is an Orthodox Church that dates back to the 12th century. Gaza Baptist Church is the city's only Evangelical Church; it lies close to the Legislative Council (parliamentary building). Christians in Gaza freely practice their religion. They also may observe all the religious holidays in accordance with the Christian calendars followed by their churches.

Those among them working as civil servants in the government and in the private sector are given an official holiday during the week, which some devote to communal prayer in churches. Christians are permitted to obtain any job, in addition to having their full rights and duties as their Muslim counterparts in accordance with the Palestinian Declaration of Independence, the regime, and all the systems prevailing over the territories. Moreover, seats have been allocated to Christian citizens in the Palestinian Legislative Council (PLC) in accordance with a quota system that allocates based on a significant Christian presence.

A census revealed that 40 percent of the Christian community worked in the medical, educational, engineering and law sectors. Additionally, the churches in Gaza are renowned for the relief and educational services that they offer, and Muslim citizens participate in these services. Palestinian citizens as a whole benefit from these services. The Latin Patriarchate School, for example, offers relief in the form of medication and social and educational services. The school has been offering services for nearly 150 years.

In 1974, the idea of establishing a new school was proposed by Father Jalil Awad, a former parish priest in Gaza who recognized the need to expand the Latin Patriarchate School and build a new complex. In 2011, the Holy family school had 1,250 students and the Roman Catholic primary school, which is an extension of the Latin Patriarchate School, continues to enroll a rising number of young students. The primary school was established approximately 20 years ago. Aside from education, other services are offered to Muslims and Christians alike with no discrimination. Services include women's groups, students' groups and youth groups, such as those offered at the Baptist Church on weekdays. As of 2013, only 113 out of 968 of these Christian schools students were in fact Christians.

In October 2007, Rami Ayyad, the Baptist manager of The Teacher's Bookshop, the only Christian bookstore in the Gaza Strip, was murdered, following the firebombing of his bookstore and the receipt of death threats from Muslim extremists.

Christian emigration

In addition to neighboring countries, such as Lebanon and Jordan, many Palestinian Christians emigrated to countries in Latin America (notably Argentina and Chile), as well as to Australia, the United States and Canada. The Palestinian Authority is unable to keep exact tallies. The share of Christians in the population has also decreased due to the fact that Muslim Palestinians generally have much higher birth rates than the Christians.

The causes of this Christian exodus are hotly debated, with various possibilities put forth. Many of the Palestinian Christians in the diaspora are those who fled or were expelled during the 1948 war and their descendants. After discussion between Yosef Weitz and Moshe Sharett, Ben-Gurion authorized a project for the transference of the Christian communities of the Galilee to Argentina, but the proposal failed in the face of Christian opposition. Reuters has reported that the emigrants since then have left in pursuit of better living standards.

The BBC has also blamed the economic decline in the Palestinian Authority as well as pressure from the Israeli-Palestinian conflict for the exodus. A report on Bethlehem residents stated both Christians and Muslims wished to leave but the Christians possessed better contacts with people abroad and higher levels of education. The Vatican and the Catholic Church blamed the Israeli occupation and the conflict in the Holy Land for the Christian exodus from the Holy Land and the Middle East in general.

The Jerusalem Post (an Israeli newspaper) has stated that the "shrinking of the Palestinian Christian community in the Holy Land came as a direct result of its middle-class standards" and that Muslim pressure has not played a major role according to Christian residents themselves. It reported that the Christians have a public image of elitism and of class privilege as well as of non-violence and of open personalities, which leaves them more vulnerable to criminals than Muslims. Hanna Siniora, a prominent Christian Palestinian human rights activist, has attributed harassment against Christians to "little groups" of "hoodlums" rather than to the Hamas and Fatah governments. In his last novel, the Palestinian Christian writer Emile Habibi has a character affirm that:
"There is no difference between Christian and Muslim: we are all Palestinian in our predicament."

According to a report in The Independent, thousands of Christian Palestinians "emigrated to Latin America in the 1920s, when Mandatory Palestine was hit by drought and a severe economic depression."

Today, Chile houses the largest Palestinian Christian community in the world outside of the Levant. As many as 350,000 Palestinian Christians reside in Chile, most of whom came from Beit Jala, Bethlehem, and Beit Sahur. Also, El Salvador, Honduras, Brazil, Colombia, Argentina, Venezuela, and other Latin American countries have significant Palestinian Christian communities, some of whom immigrated almost a century ago during the time of Ottoman Palestine. During the 2008 Gaza War, Palestinian Christians in Chile demonstrated against the Israeli bombardment of Gaza. They were hoping to move the government into altering its relations with Israel.

In a 2006 poll of Christians in Bethlehem by the Palestinian Centre for Research and Cultural Dialogue, 90% reported having Muslim friends, 73% agreed that the Palestinian Authority treats Christian heritage in the city with respect, and 78% attributed the ongoing exodus of Christians from Bethlehem to the Israeli occupation and travel restrictions on the area. Daniel Rossing, the Israeli Ministry of Religious Affairs' chief liaison to Christians in the 1970s and 1980s, has stated that the situations for them in Gaza became much worse after the election of Hamas. He also stated that the Palestinian Authority, which counts on Christian westerners for financial support, treats the minority fairly. He blamed the Israeli West Bank barrier as the primary problem for the Christians.

The United States State Department's 2006 report on religious freedom criticized both Israel for its restrictions on travel to Christian holy sites and the Palestinian Authority for its failure to stamp out anti-Christian crime. It also reported that the former gives preferential treatment in basic civic services to Jews and the latter does so to Muslims. The report stated that, generally, ordinary Muslim and Christian citizens enjoy good relations in contrast to the "strained" Jewish and Arab relations. A 2005 BBC report also described Muslim and Christian relations as "peaceful".

The Arab Human Rights Association, an Arab NGO in Israel, has stated that Israeli authorities have denied Palestinian Christians in Israel access to holy places, prevented repairs needed to preserve historic holy sites, and carried out physical attacks on religious leaders.

Multiple factors, the internal dislocation of Palestinians in wars; the creation of three contiguous refugee camps for those displaced; emigration of Muslims from Hebron; hindrances to development under Israeli military occupation with its land confiscations, and a lax and corrupt judicial system under the PNA that is often incapable of enforcing laws, have all contributed to Christian emigration, which has been a tradition since the British Mandate period. 
This has been contested, as the main cause of Christian emigration from Bethlehem, Kairos Palestine—an independent coalition Christian organisation, set up to help communicate to the Christian world what is happening in Palestine—sent a letter to The Wall Street Journal to explain that "In the case of Bethlehem, for instance, it is in fact the rampant construction of Israeli settlements, the chokehold imposed by the separation wall and the Israeli government's confiscation of Palestinian land that has driven many Christians to leave," the unprinted letter, quoted in Haaretz, states. "At present, a mere 13 percent of Bethlehem-area land is left to its Palestinian inhabitants".

Persecutions
There have been reports of attacks on Palestinian Christians in Gaza from Muslim extremist groups. Gaza Pastor Manuel Musallam has voiced doubts that those attacks were religiously motivated. The Palestinian President, Prime Minister, Hamas and many other political and religious leaders condemned such attacks.

Fr Pierbattista Pizzaballa, the Custodian of the Holy Land, a senior Catholic spokesman, has stated that police inaction and an educational culture that encourages Jewish children to treat Christians with "contempt" has made life increasingly "intolerable" for many Christians. Fr Pizzaballa's statement came after pro-settler extremists attacked a Trappist monastery in the town of Latroun, setting fire to its door, and covering walls with anti-Christian graffiti. The incident followed a series of acts of arson and vandalism, in 2012, targeting places of Christian worship, including Jerusalem's 11th century Monastery of the Cross, where slogans such as "Death to Christians" and other offensive graffiti were daubed on its walls. According to an article in the Telegraph, Christian leaders feel that the most important issue that Israel has failed to address is the practice of some ultra-Orthodox Jewish schools to teach children that it is a religious obligation to abuse anyone in Holy Orders they encounter in public, such that Ultra-Orthodox Jews, including children as young as eight, spit at members of the clergy on a daily basis.

After Pope Benedict XVI's comments on Islam in September 2006, five churches not affiliated with either Catholicism or the Pope—among them an Anglican and an Orthodox church—were firebombed and shot at in the West Bank and Gaza. A Muslim extremist group called "Lions of Monotheism" claimed responsibility. Former Palestinian Prime Minister and current Hamas leader Ismail Haniya condemned the attacks, and police presence was elevated in Bethlehem, which has a sizable Christian community.

Armenians in Jerusalem, identified as Palestinian Christians or Israeli-Armenians, have also been attacked and received threats from Jewish extremists; Christians and clergy have been spat at, and one Armenian Archbishop was beaten and his centuries old cross broken. In September 2009, two Armenian Christian clergy were expelled after a brawl erupted with a Jewish extremist for spitting on holy Christian objects.

In February 2009, a group of Christian activists within the West Bank wrote an open letter asking Pope Benedict XVI to postpone his scheduled trip to Israel unless the government changed its treatment. They highlighted improved access to places of worship and ending the taxation of church properties as key concerns. The Pope began his five-day visit to Israel and the Palestinian Authority on Sunday, 10 May, planning to express support for the region's Christians. In response to Palestinian public statements, Israeli Foreign Ministry spokesman Yigal Palmor criticized the political polarization of the papal visit, remarking that "[i]t will serve the cause of peace much better if this visit is taken for what it is, a pilgrimage, a visit for the cause of peace and unity".
Bethlehem
Christian families are the largest landowners in Bethlehem and have often been subject to theft of property. Bethlehem's core of traditional Christian and Muslim families speak of the rise of a 'foreign', more conservative, Islamic Hebronite class as changing the traditional regional identity of the town, as are the villages dominated by the Ta'amre Bedouin clans close to Bethlehem. Rising Muslim land purchase, said at times to be Saudi-financed, and incidents of land theft with forged documents, except in Beit Sahour where Christian and Muslims share a strong sense of local identity, are seen by Christians as making their demographic presence vulnerable. Christians are often described as of Yamani descent (as are some Muslim clans), vs the al-Qaysi Muslim clans, respectively from southern and northern Arabia. Christians are wary of the international media and of discussing these issues publicly, which involve criticism of fellow Palestinians, since there is a risk that their remarks may be manipulated by outsiders to undermine Palestinian claims to nationhood, distract attention from the crippling impact of Israel's occupation, and conjure up an image of a Muslim drive to oust Christians from Bethlehem.

The Christian Broadcasting Network (an American Protestant organization) claimed that Palestinian Christians suffer systematic discrimination and persecution at the hands of the predominantly Muslim population and Palestinian government aimed at driving their population out of their homeland. However, Palestinian Christians in Bethlehem and Beit Jala have claimed otherwise that it is the loss of agricultural land and expropriation from the Israeli military, the persecution of 1948 and violence from the military occupation that has led to a flight and major exodus of Christians.

On 26 September 2015, the Mar Charbel monastery in Bethlehem was set on fire, resulting in the burning of many rooms and damaging various parts of the building.

In September 2016, the Jerusalem-based Center for Jewish–Christian Understanding and Cooperation (CJCUC) established "Blessing Bethlehem", a charity fundraising initiative with the purpose of helping the persecuted Christians living in the city of Bethlehem and its surrounding areas.

Notable Palestinian Christians

Canonized

 Saint Marie-Alphonsine Danil Ghattas – founder of the Congregation of the Rosary Sisters, the only Arab religious order in the Holy Land to date

Monks
 Cosmas of Maiuma
 Dorotheus of Gaza
 Theodore of the Jordan
 Sabbas the Sanctified
 Theophanes the Branded
 Zosimas of Palestine

Clergymen
 Munib Younan – president of the Lutheran World Federation since 2010 and the Bishop of the Evangelical Lutheran Church of Jerusalem, Palestine, Jordan and the Holy Land since 1998
 Archbishop Theodosios (Hanna) of Sebastia – Bishop of the Eastern Orthodox Patriarchate of Jerusalem
 Michel Sabbah – former Latin Patriarch of Jerusalem (Roman Catholic)
 Fouad Twal – former Latin Patriarch of Jerusalem (Roman Catholic)
 Naim Ateek – leader of Sabeel Christian Ecumenical Foundation
 Mitri Raheb – pastor of the Evangelical Lutheran Christmas Church in Bethlehem
 Suheil Salman Ibrahim Dawani – the current Anglican Bishop in Jerusalem
 Elias Chacour – Archbishop of Akko, Haifa, Nazareth and Galilee of the Melkite Eastern Catholic Church
 Riah Hanna Abu El-Assal – former Anglican Bishop in Jerusalem
 Anis Shorrosh – Palestinian Evangelical Protestant pastor
 Benny Hinn – Protestant televangelist
 Patriarch Theophilos III of Jerusalem – current Orthodox patriarch of Jerusalem
 Manuel Musallam - retired Roman Catholic priest, who was pastor in Gaza from 1995 to 2009.
 Boutros Mouallem – retired Melkite Eastern Catholic Church archbishop of Acre, Haifa and the Galilee
 Samir Kafity – prominent former Anglican Bishop in Jerusalem
 Salim Munayer – founder of Musalaha, a non-profit organization that works towards reconciliation between Israelis and Palestinians based on the Biblical principles of peace, works mainly among Palestinian Evangelical Protestants and Messianic Jews
 Patriarch Diodoros of Jerusalem – late Orthodox Patriarch of Jerusalem
 Patriarch Irenaios – former Orthodox patriarch of Jerusalem
 Torkom Manoogian – current Patriarch of the Armenian Patriarchate of Jerusalem
 Faik Haddad – prominent former Anglican Bishop in Jerusalem.

Palestinian Roman Catholics
 :Category:Palestinian Roman Catholics

Politicians
 John H. Sununu – Governor of New Hampshire (1983–1989) and White House Chief of Staff to President George H. W. Bush (1989–1991)
 Joe Hockey – Treasurer of Australia (2013–2015), Member of Parliament for North Sydney (1996–2015), Ambassador of Australia to the United States (2016-Current)
 Raymonda Tawil – poet, political activist, journalist, writer and the mother-in-law of the late Palestinian President Yasser Arafat
 Antonio Saca – President of El Salvador from 2004 to 2009
 Justin Amash – U.S. Representative for Michigan's 3rd congressional district (2011–2021) which encompasses the Grand Rapids area, and a member of the Republican Party (later Libertarian Party)
 Vera Baboun – first female mayor of Bethlehem
 Azmi Bishara – Arab-Israeli politician
 Janet Mikhail –  former mayor of Ramallah
 Karim Khalaf – attorney and politician who served as the Mayor of Ramallah, but was removed from office in 1982 by Israel
 Victor Batarseh – former mayor of Bethlehem
 Elias Bandak – former mayor of Bethlehem
 Hanna Nasser – former mayor of Bethlehem
 Elias Freij – former mayor of Bethlehem
 Emil Habibi – politician born in Mandatory Palestine, leader of the Israel Communist Party and Member of the Israeli Knesset
 Ameer Makhoul – founder of the Haifa-based Ittijah (the Union of Arab Community-Based Associations, a network for Palestinian NGOs in Israel), who is jailed in Israel until released in 2019, after some claims for spying on behalf of Hezbollah. Amnesty International expressed concern that "his human rights activism on behalf of Palestinians" may be the reason for his imprisonment.
 George Habash – politician, founder of the PFLP and the Arab Nationalist Movement
 Nayif Hawatmeh – Palestinian politician, founder and General Secretary of the DFLP
 Dr. Hanan Ashrawi – politician, legislator, activist, and scholar. Currently, she is a leader of the Third Way party. She was previously notable as a spokesperson for Arafat.
 Afif Safieh – diplomat and was most recently the Palestinian ambassador to the Russian Federation
 Joudeh George Murqos – ex-Palestinian minister of tourism
 Ghazi Hanania – member of the Palestinian Legislative Council and Fatah
 Emil Ghuri – former Secretary of the Arab Higher Committee (AHC), the official leadership of the Arabs in the British Mandate of Palestine. He was also the general secretary of the Palestine Arab Party
 Hanna Nasser (academic) – academic, political figure and ex-president of Birzeit University
 Ghassan Andoni – a professor of physics at Birzeit University, co-founder of the International Solidarity Movement (ISM) and founder of the International Middle East Media Centre
 Daud Turki – poet and was the leader of the Jewish-Arab left-wing group called the Red Front
 Imil Jarjoui – former member of the Palestinian Legislative Council and the PLO executive committee
 Huwaida Arraf – rights activist and co-founder of the International Solidarity Movement (ISM)
 Michael Tarazi – lawyer and former adviser to the Palestine Liberation Organization
 Kamal Nasser – PLO political leader, writer and poet
 Layla Moran – first British MP of Palestinian descent

Journalists

 Shireen Abu Akleh –  journalist who worked as a reporter for the Arabic-language channel Al Jazeera for 25 years
 Issa El-Issa – the founder of Filastin newspaper in Jaffa, Palestine 1909
 Yousef El-Issa – Issa's cousin who also founded Filastin newspaper in 1909, he also established Alif Ba' newspaper in Damascus, Syria
 Raja El-Issa – Issa's son, who took manager position of the newspaper after his father's death, he was also the first chairman of the Jordan Press Association in Amman, Jordan in 1956
 Daoud El-Issa – Issa's nephew who also had the manager position of the newspaper, established Al-Bilad newspaper in Jerusalem in 1956 and became a member of Jordan Press Association in 1976

Cultural figures
 Ashraf Barhom – Christian actor from Tarshiha, northern Israel. 
 Edward Said – Palestinian literary theorist, cultural critic, political activist
 Rosemarie Said Zahlan – historian and writer
 George Antonius – founder of modern Arab nationalist history
 Khalil Beidas – scholar, educator, translator and novelist during the Al-Nahda cultural renaissance
 Khalil al-Sakakini – educator, scholar, poet, and Arab nationalist during the Al-Nahda cultural renaissance
 Tawfiq Canaan – physician, researcher of Palestinian popular heritage
 May Ziadeh – poet, essayist and translator during the Al-Nahda cultural renaissance
 Elia Suleiman – Palestinian film maker and actor
 Hanna Musleh – Palestinian film maker and university professor
 Raja Shehadeh – lawyer and writer
 Rifat Odeh Kassis – human rights activist
 George Saliba – Professor of Arabic and Islamic Science at the Department of Middle Eastern, South Asian, and African Studies, Columbia University, New York, United States
 Rami George Khouri – journalist and editor
 Hisham Zreiq – award-winning independent film maker, poet and visual artist
 Ray Hanania – Palestinian-American journalist also known for his stand-up comedy
 Joseph Massad – Associate Professor of Modern Arab Politics and Intellectual History in the Department of Middle Eastern, South Asian, and African Studies at Columbia University
 Rim Banna – singer, composer, and arranger who is well known for her modern interpretations of traditional Palestinian folk songs
 Amal Murkus – singer
 Anton Shammas – essayist, writer of fiction and poetry and translator
 Fady Andraos – singer and actor
 Karl Sabbagh – Palestinian-British writer, journalist and television producer
 Suleiman Mansour – Prominent Palestinian painter
 Sabri Jiryis – writer and lawyer
 Leila Sansour – film director
 Makram Khoury – actor
 Clara Khoury – actress
 Kamal Boullata – artist & writer, Boulatta is the author of several studies on Palestinian art in particular, Palestinian Art (Saqi 2009) and Between Exits: Paintings by Hani Zurob (Black Dog 2012).
 Steve Sabella – artist
 Ibrahim Fawal – Palestinian American academic, former professor, and author of the historical novel On the Hills of God.

Palestinian Christian militants
 Sirhan Sirhan – assassin of United States Senator Robert F. Kennedy
 Chris Bandak – Palestinian Christian militant and a leader of the Al-Aqsa Martyrs' Brigades and the Tanzim, both armed wings of the Fatah movement, convicted and imprisoned in Israel until 2011.
 Wadie Haddad – Palestinian leader of the Popular Front for the Liberation of Palestine's armed wing. He was responsible for organizing several civilian airplane hijackings in support of the Palestinian cause in the 1960s and 1970s.
 George Habash – founded the Popular Front for the Liberation of Palestine.

Palestinian businesspeople
 Yousef Beidas – founder of Intra Bank
 Hind Khoury – Palestinian Delegate-General to France
 Hasib Sabbagh – entrepreneur and businessman
 Zahi Khouri – Palestinian-American businessman and entrepreneur

Palestinian activists
 Sumaya Farhat Naser – peace activist
 Mubarak Awad – Palestinian-American psychologist and an advocate of nonviolent resistance
 Alex Odeh – Palestinian-American anti-discrimination activist
 Khalil Jahshan – lecturer in International Studies and Languages at Pepperdine University and executive director of its Seaver College Washington DC Internship Program
 Salim Joubran – Justice on the Israeli Supreme Court
 Mira Awad – singer, actress and songwriter
 Dr. Wadie Haddad – member and the leader of the national resistance wing of the Popular Front for the Liberation of Palestine (PFLP), who was allegedly killed by Israel
 Hanna Siniora – publisher and human rights activist

Other
 Sami Aldeeb – Palestinian-Swiss lawyer and author of many books and articles on Arab and Islamic law born to a Palestinian Christian family; left Christianity and became a nontheist.
 Roberto Bishara – Palestinian football defender
 Ibrahim Hazboun – Palestinian astrologer
 Michel Shehadeh – Palestinian-American, member of the Los Angeles 8

See also

Arab Christians
Arab citizens of Israel: Christians
Christianity in Israel
Demographic history of Palestine (region)

References

Further reading
 Morris, Benny, 1948: A History of the First Arab-Israeli War, (2009) Yale University Press. 
 Reiter, Yitzhak, National Minority, Regional Majority: Palestinian Arabs Versus Jews in Israel (Syracuse Studies on Peace and Conflict Resolution)'', (2009) Syracuse Univ Press (Sd).

External links

 Palestinian Christians in the Holy Land and the Diaspora. Latin Patriarchate of Jerusalem, 21 October 2014
 Palestinian Christians in the Holy Land. Institute for Middle East Understanding, 17 December 2012
 Christian Presence in Palestine and the Diaspora: Statistics, Challenges and Opportunities . Global Ministries, 31 August 2012
 Middle East Christians: Gaza pastor (Interview with Hanna Massad). BBC News. Published 21 December 2005.
  at Al Jazeera English
  at Al Jazeera English
 Bethlehem University
 "What is it like to be a Palestinian Christian?" at Beliefnet.com
 Religion in the news – Israelis and Palestinians
 Hard Time in the House of Bread
 Al-Bushra  (an Arab-American Catholic perspective)
 Palestinian Christians: Challenges and Hopes by Bernard Sabella
 Salt of the Earth: Palestinian Christians in the Northern West Bank, a documentary film series
 Arab Christians in Israel threaten to close their churches. MEMO, 28 September 2015

 
Palestine